DALnet is an Internet Relay Chat (IRC) network made up of 39 servers, with a stable population of approximately 10,000 users in about 4,000 channels.

DALnet is accessible by connecting with an IRC client to an active DALnet server on ports 6660 through 6669, and 7000. SSL users can connect on port 6697 as well.

History
DALnet was founded in July 1994 by members of the EFnet #startrek channel. This new network was known as "dal's net", after the nickname used by the administrator of the first IRC server on the network, "dalvenjah", taken from the dragon "Dalvenjah Foxfire", in a fantasy novel by Thorarinn Gunnarsson. The network was soon renamed from dal's net to DALnet.

In contrast to other IRC networks of the time, in 1995 DALnet implemented "services", a system that enforced IRC nickname and channel registrations. Traditionally, on IRC, anybody can own a channel or a nickname; if no one is using it, it can be used by anyone who chooses to do so. On DALnet, however, this was no longer the case. This service—which many users saw as a way of firmly establishing their online identities—was a significant factor in DALnet's popularity and afforded the network a distinctive reputation among IRCers. While attempts to implement a similar system had been made before and other networks have since developed registration services of their own, at the time DALnet's successful decision to allow and enforce nickname and channel registration was considered to be unique and even controversial, as it went against established practice.

From 25 users in July 1994, the number of users grew to 1,000 by November 1995, 5,000 by June 1996, 10,000 by December 1996, 50,000 by October 1999, 100,000 in November 2001, and peaked around 142,000 in April 2002, by which time the network had 44 servers. At that point DALnet was one of the four biggest IRC networks.

The network was severely disrupted in late 2002 and early 2003 by distributed denial of service (DDoS) attacks. Added to the DDoS issues was the fact that the owner of twisted.dal.net (the world's largest single IRC server, hosting more than 50,000 clients most of the time) delinked his servers (for personal reasons). The other servers on the network could not absorb the extra client load, leading to users' complete inability to connect to DALnet. The network was first crushed by attacks, and then by its own user base.

It was around this time that DALnet closed many of their channels that were dedicated to serving content such as MP3 files and movies. File transfers were still allowed but not on a large scale. This raised suspicion as to whether DALnet was being targeted by the RIAA,  although this was not true, but a precautionary measure.

In 2003, DALnet put up their first anycast servers under the name "The IX Concept", and made irc.dal.net resolve to the anycast IP. Since then, most new client servers linked are anycast.

Characteristics 
The main characteristics of DALnet is its ChanServ services which was invented on DALnet in 1995. Along with NickServ it gave a solid ground for usability and security on IRC where users got the ability to register their nicknames and their channels.

DALnet is also developing and running on its own ircd software called Bahamut which is based on ircd-hybrid and Dreamforge and was first live in the early 2000s. The name Bahamut comes from a silver-white dragon with blue eyes standing for protection, wisdom, justice and hope in Dungeons & Dragons.

References

External links
 DALnet website
 DALnet documentation
 DALnet history
 Impact of the DDoS attacks on DALnet

Internet Relay Chat networks
Internet properties established in 1994